Jorge Horacio Rodríguez Grossi (born 24 October 1947) is a Chilean politician who served as minister.

References

External links
 Profile at Alberto Hurtado University

1947 births
Living people
Chilean people of Italian descent

21st-century Chilean politicians
University of Chile alumni
Boston University alumni
Christian Democratic Party (Chile) politicians
Politicians from Santiago